Kersti is mainly an Estonian feminine given name.

People named Kersti include:

 Kersti Bergroth (1886–1975), Finnish author and playwright
 Kersti Börjars (born 1960), Swedish linguistics scholar
 Kersti Heinloo (born 1976), Estonian actress
 Kersti Juva (born 1948), Finnish translator
 Kersti Kreismann (born 1947), Estonian actress
 Kersti Kaljulaid (born 1969), Estonian politician, fifth President of Estonia
 Kersti Merilaas (1913–1986), Estonian poet and translator
 Kersti Sarapuu (born 1954), Estonian politician

Fictional characters named Kersti include:

 Kersti, Mario's main companion in the 2012 video game Paper Mario: Sticker Star

See also 
 Kirsti, a given name
 Kirsty, a given name

References 

Estonian feminine given names